Neginan (also Romanized as Negīnān; also known as Nagīnu) is a village in Fakhrud Rural District, Qohestan District, Darmian County, South Khorasan Province, Iran. At the 2006 census, its population was 354, in 114 families.

References 

Populated places in Darmian County